Drake & Josh: Talent Showdown is the second and last video game based on the Nickelodeon sitcom Drake & Josh.

Plot
Drake and Josh win the infamous talent show, Teen American Talent, by avoiding sabotages from other contestants and by perfecting their music. The game allows the player to interact with characters from the TV show, including Drake, Josh and Megan. Secrets and bonuses can be unlocked in the DS game by linking it up with the Game Boy Advance game Drake & Josh.

Reception

Drake & Josh: Talent Showdown received "generally unfavorable" reviews according to Metacritic. Nintendo Gamer called it an "awful mess of a game".

References

External links
IGN page
GameSpot page

Talent Showdown
Action-adventure games
Nintendo DS games
Nintendo DS-only games
THQ games
2007 video games
North America-exclusive video games
Video games developed in Canada
Single-player video games